Porter-Cable is an American company that manufactures power tools. Known for pioneering the portable belt sander, helical-drive circular saw, and portable band saw, it is a subsidiary of Stanley Black & Decker.

History 
Porter-Cable was founded in 1906 in Syracuse, New York, by R.E. Porter, G.G. Porter, and F.E. Cable, who invested $2,300 in a jobbing machine and tool shop the trio ran out of a garage.

In 1914, the company began to focus on power tools, starting with a line of lathes. Three years later, the company bought a plant on North Salina Street.

In 1926, Porter-Cable began to develop a niche in portable electric power tools when Chief Engineer Art Emmons invented the portable electric belt sander, called the Take-About Sander.

In 1929, Emmons invented the helical drive circular saw, a compact, lightweight design that is still the most widely used circular saw design produced today.

In 1960, the company was sold to Rockwell International. Rockwell made numerous changes, including phasing out the Porter-Cable name, relocating the company's base of operations to Jackson, Tennessee, and creating a lower end of power tools to compete with Black & Decker. These tools had numerous reliability problems and harmed the brand's image.

In 1981, Pentair, Inc. acquired Rockwell's power tool group — consisting of Porter-Cable and Delta Machinery — and restored the Porter-Cable name. The company ended production of consumer level tools, and repositioned itself as a manufacturer of professional power tools.

In 1989, it introduced the first electric random orbital sander.
Around this time, the company returned to consumer tools, sold via retail outlets which included The Home Depot and Lowe's, greatly expanding its sales.

In 1996, the Smithsonian Institution established a collection of materials from the company's ninety-year history, the first such effort for a power tool company.

In 2000, Porter-Cable consolidated with sister company Delta Machinery, the latter moving its headquarters and distribution center from Pittsburgh, Pennsylvania to Jackson. The same year, Pentair acquired DeVilbiss Air Power Company and, in 2002, Porter-Cable expanded its line-up to include air compressors, air tools, generators, and pressure washers.

In October 2004, the Pentair Tools Group — comprising Porter-Cable, Delta Machinery, DeVilbiss Air Power, and others — was purchased by Black & Decker, now Stanley Black & Decker. Porter-Cable is headquartered in Jackson, Tennessee. Manufacturing in the United States has mostly ceased; tools are now made primarily in Mexico and China.

See also 

 Delta Machinery
 DeVilbiss Air Power Company

References 
 "History." Delta Machinery/Porter-Cable web site. Retrieved December 10, 2009.
 Berger, Matt. "Dick Jarmon: Ultimate Tool Collector." Fine Woodworking. January 8, 2008.
 Hicks, Jennifer. "Tool Collector is Porter-Cable's Top Fan." Woodshop News. October 2007.

External links 
 Delta Machinery/Porter-Cable web site
 DeWalt ServiceNet (parts and service site)
 "Vintage Power Tools To Smithsonian" (Popular Mechanics article from December 1997)

American companies established in 1906
Manufacturing companies established in 1906
Manufacturing companies based in Tennessee
Woodworking hand-held power tools
Power tool manufacturers
Pneumatic tool manufacturers
Stanley Black & Decker brands
1906 establishments in New York (state)
Jackson, Tennessee
1960 mergers and acquisitions
1981 mergers and acquisitions
2004 mergers and acquisitions
Tool manufacturing companies of the United States